Radhouane Salhi (born 18 December 1967) is a former Tunisian footballer who played as a goalkeeper. He spent his 15-year career at Étoile du Sahel.

International career
Salhi made his debut for the Tunisia national football team in December 1994 against Algeria and was named in squad for the 1998 FIFA World Cup, without playing any matches. His last international match was a friendly match against Togo in January 2000, coming off the bench to replace Chokri El Ouaer.

Honours
Étoile du Sahel
Tunisian Ligue: 1986, 1987, 1997
Tunisian President Cup: 1996
Tunisian Super Cup: 1986, 1987
African Cup Winners' Cup: 1997
CAF Cup: 1995, 1999
African Super Cup: 1998

References

1967 births
Living people
Tunisian footballers
Tunisia international footballers
1998 FIFA World Cup players
1994 African Cup of Nations players
1998 African Cup of Nations players
2000 African Cup of Nations players
Tunisian Ligue Professionnelle 1 players
Étoile Sportive du Sahel players
Place of birth missing (living people)
Association football goalkeepers